This is a list of museums in Veneto, Italy.

References

Veneto
Museums in Veneto